Paulo Vinícius de Souza Nascimento (born 12 August 1984), known as Paulo Vinícius, is a Brazilian footballer who plays as a defender. He can occupy all three defensive positions.

He spent the vast majority of his professional career in Portugal, amassing Primeira Liga totals of 126 matches and nine goals in representation of four clubs. In 2017 he signed with CFR Cluj in Romania, where he won several club and individual honours.

Club career

Portugal
Born in Cuiabá, Mato Grosso, Vinícius only played lower league football in his country. In 2006 he signed with Portuguese club Santa Clara, making his debut in the Segunda Liga on 27 August in a 1–0 away win against Portimonense where he played the full 90 minutes. He scored his first goal of the season on 14 January 2007, but in a 2–1 loss at Gil Vicente.

Remaining in the country, Vinícius joined Leixões in the summer of 2007. His first match in the Primeira Liga took place on 3 November of that year, when he came on as a late substitute in the 3–0 home victory over Braga. During the 2008 January transfer window, still owned by Grêmio Anápolis, he moved to Olhanense.

Vinícius signed for União de Leiria for 2008–09, netting twice during the campaign to help his team return to the top division after a one-year absence. In the following years he continued to be regularly used, notably scoring in a 1–0 away defeat of Sporting CP on 12 December 2009.

Subsequently, and save for a short spell back in his country with amateurs Operário, Vinícius continued to compete in the Portuguese top tier, featuring regularly at Braga but also dealing with injury problems and starting at Boavista. He helped the former side win the 2012–13 edition of the Taça da Liga notably playing the entire semi-final against Benfica where they emerged victorious after a penalty shootout.

Apollon
In the summer of 2016, the 32-year-old Vinícius joined Apollon Limassol from the Cypriot First Division. He scored a career-best six goals in his only season, also finding the net in the final of the domestic cup where his team defeated APOEL 1–0.

Romania
Vinícius signed for Romanian team CFR Cluj in June 2017. He scored his first goal on 14 August, helping to a 2–0 Liga I away victory over Sepsi OSK. On 10 February 2018, he opened a 1–1 draw with title contenders FCSB, being an undisputed starter in his first year as the club won the fourth national championship in its history.

Vinícius left Cluj-Napoca in the summer of 2021 upon the expiration of his contract, after winning the national title in every possible season as well as two Supercupa României. On 27 July that year, aged nearly 37, he agreed to a one-year deal with FCSB. His first goal came in a 6–0 derby rout of Dinamo București on 12 September.

Career statistics

Club

Honours
Braga
Taça da Liga: 2012–13

Apollon Limassol
Cypriot Cup: 2016–17
Cypriot Super Cup: 2016

CFR Cluj
Liga I: 2017–18, 2018–19, 2019–20, 2020–21
Supercupa României: 2018, 2020

Individual
Foreign Player of the Year in Romania (Gazeta Sporturilor): 2020
Liga I Team of the Season: 2017–18, 2018–19, 2019–20

References

External links

1984 births
Living people
People from Cuiabá
Sportspeople from Mato Grosso
Brazilian footballers
Association football defenders
Association football midfielders
Association football utility players
Cuiabá Esporte Clube players
Operário Futebol Clube (Várzea Grande) players
Mixto Esporte Clube players
CE Operário Várzea-Grandense players
Primeira Liga players
Liga Portugal 2 players
C.D. Santa Clara players
Leixões S.C. players
S.C. Olhanense players
U.D. Leiria players
S.C. Braga players
Boavista F.C. players
Cypriot First Division players
Apollon Limassol FC players
Liga I players
CFR Cluj players
FC Steaua București players
Brazilian expatriate footballers
Expatriate footballers in Portugal
Expatriate footballers in Cyprus
Expatriate footballers in Romania
Brazilian expatriate sportspeople in Portugal
Brazilian expatriate sportspeople in Cyprus
Brazilian expatriate sportspeople in Romania